Mihrimah Sultan ("sun and moon" or "light of the moon", ; 1522 – 25 January 1578) was an Ottoman princess, the daughter of Ottoman Sultan Süleyman the Magnificent and his wife, Hürrem Sultan. She was the most powerful imperial princess in Ottoman history according to historian Mustafa Selaniki who described her as the greatest and most respected princess and a prominent figure in the so-called Sultanate of Women. In Europe she was known as Sultana Cameria, while in Constantinople she was known as Büyük Sultan (the Great Sultana).

Name 
Mihrimah or Mihrümah means "Sun and Moon", or "Moon of the Suns" in Persian. To Westerners, she was known as Cameria, which is a variant of "Qamariah", an Arabic version of her name meaning "of the moon". Her portrait by Cristofano dell'Altissimo was entitled Cameria Solimani. She was also known as Hanım Sultan, which means "Madam Princess".

Early life
Mihrimah was born in Constantinople (Istanbul) in 1522 during the reign of her father, Süleyman the Magnificent. Her mother was Hürrem Sultan, an Orthodox priest's daughter, who was the Sultan's concubine but was freed in 1533 or 1534 and became Suleyman's legal wife. Mihrimah had five brothers: Şehzade Mehmed, Şehzade Abdullah, who died at the age of three, Şehzade Selim (the future Selim II), Şehzade Bayezid, and Şehzade Cihangir. Well-educated and disciplined, she was also sophisticated, eloquent and well-read.

Marriage

In 1539, Süleyman decided that Mihrimah should be married to Rüstem Pasha, probably from Croatia,  who had been seized through the devshirme and rose to become Governor of Diyarbakır and later, Grand Vizier. However, Hürrem believed that she should be married to the more handsome governor of Cairo. Rüstem's enemies circulated a rumour that he had leprosy but the doctor dispatched to Diyarbakır to examine him found this to be untrue, although a louse was found in his clothing, despite the fact that he changed his garments daily.

The marriage took place on 26 November 1539 in the Old Palace, when Mihrimah was seventeen. Her wedding ceremony and the celebration for her younger brothers Bayezid and Cihangir's circumcision occurred on the same day, the collective festivities lasting fifteen days. Five years later in 1544, Süleyman selected her husband to become Grand Vizier, a post he held until his death in 1561, bar a two-year interval when he was dismissed to assuage popular outrage following the execution of Şehzade (Crown Prince) Mustafa in 1553.

Shortly after Mihrimah's wedding she developed a rheumatoid-like condition and spent most of her life dealing with the illness. In 1544 she traveled to Bursa with her mother and husband and a large military escort. Although Mihrimah and her mother made efforts to promote Rüstem as an intimate of the sultan, he was actually kept at a distance from the royal presence. Mihrimah and Rüstem had one daughter, Ayşe Hümaşah Sultan, born in 1541, and a son, Sultanzade Osman Bey, born in 1546.

In 1554, Mihrimah suffered a life-threatening miscarriage which almost cost her her life. An anonymous author suggested that the couple lived in Pera, although it is more likely that they settled in Mihrimah's palace in Üsküdar. In March 1558, Shaykh Qutb al-Din al-Nahrawali, a religious figure from Mecca, visited Istanbul. In April, he met Mihrimah, and gave her gifts.  He met her again in June just before he left Istanbul for Cairo.

After Rüstem's death in 1561, she offered to marry Semiz Ali Pasha, who had succeeded him as grand vizier. When he  declined, she chose not to marry again, returning instead to the royal palace.

Issue 
Mihrimah had at least two children by her marriage to Rüstem: 
 Ayşe Hümaşah Sultan (Constantinople, 1541 – Constantinople, 1598) 
 Sultanzade Osman Bey (Constantinople, 1546 – Constantinople, 1576)

Political affairs

Although there is no proof of Hürrem or Mihrimah's direct involvement in her half-brother Şehzade Mustafa's downfall, Ottoman and foreign accounts suggest that it was widely believed that Mihrimah worked with Hürrem and Rüstem to eliminate Mustafa to ensure the throne for Hürrem's son and Mihrimah's full brother, Bayezid. The rivalry ended when Mustafa was executed at his own father's command in 1553 during the campaign against Safavid Persia. Although these accounts were not based on first-hand sources, a fear of Mustafa was not unreasonable: had he ascended to the throne, all Mihrimah's full brothers (Selim, Bayezid, and Cihangir) would probably have been executed, according to the fratricidal custom of the Ottoman dynasty, which required the brothers of a new sultan to be executed to avoid feuding. Mihrimah, Rüstem and Hürrem were also blamed for the execution in 1555 of the Grand Vizier Kara Ahmed Pasha, whose elimination cleared the way for Rüstem's return as Grand Vizier.

Hürrem sent letters to Sigismund II, King of Poland and Grand Duke of Lithuania, the contents of which were mirrored in letters written by Mihrimah, and sent by the same courier, who also carried letters from the sultan and her husband Rüstem Pasha the Grand Vizier. After Hürrem's death, Mihrimah also became Süleyman's advisor and confidant,  urging him to undertake the conquest of Malta in 1565, and sending him news and forwarding letters for him when he was absent from the capital. She enlisted the help of the Grand Vizier Semiz Ali Pasha, and promised to outfit four hundred ships at her own expense. However, Süleyman and his son Selim prevented the campaign from proceeding so that the admiral, Piyale Pasha, could stay in Istanbul with his new wife, Gevherhan Sultan, Selim's daughter. It is also likely that she encouraged Süleyman's decision to launch a campaign against Hungary in 1566, where he met his death at Szigetvár.

Temporary closures of the western and/or eastern grain markets, food shortages and poor harvests led to several crises in the sixteenth century. The citizens of the Dalmatian Republic of Ragusa managed to survive thanks to supplies of Ottoman grain which Mihrimah helped to facilitate. The Ragusans' decision to approach Mihrimah for help may have been the result of tensions between the Republic and the kapudan pasha, Piyale Pasha. During the Ottoman siege of Malta in 1565, several Ragusan ships sailed in the Christian fleet, as Piyale Pasha reported to the Porte. To Ragusan horror, his ships sailed into their waters and raided the island of Mljet. However, true problems emerged in 1566, leading Ragusan ambassadors to petition Mihrimah to act as their protector.

In later years Mihrimah retired to the Old Palace. As soon as he came to power, Selim turned to her for help as he needed money, after which she lent him fifty thousand gold coins. She then continued to act as his advisor.  In 1571, the Ragusans asked her to speak to the sultan on their behalf, and to "spare a couple of kind words for their love's sake".

In 1575, during the reign of her nephew Sultan Murad III, her daily stipend consisted of 600 aspers. When the French refused to return two Turkish women who had been captured at sea by Henry III's brother-in-law and made members of Catherine de' Medici's court, Mihrimah and her niece, Ismihan Sultan intervened on their behalf. When Cığalazade Yusuf Sinan Pasha married her granddaughter in October 1576. Mihrimah provided him with a huge dowry including gold and valuable clothes. She also supported him against his rivals inside the court such as Safiye Sultan, Ferhad Pasha, Damat Ibrahim and Halil Pashas.

Mosques and charities

Mihrimah also sponsored a number of major architectural projects. Her most famous foundations are the two Istanbul mosque complexes that bear her name, both designed by her father's chief architect, Mimar Sinan. 

The first Mihrimah Sultan Mosque (Turkish: Mihrimah Sultan Camii), also known as the İskele Mosque (Turkish: İskele Camii), is one of Üsküdar's most prominent landmarks and was built between 1543 or 1544 and 1548. The twin-minaret mosque complex consisted of a mosque, a medrese, a soup kitchen to feed the poor, a clinic and a primary school. The primary school, library and medrese are now used as an outpatient clinic. 

The second Mihrimah Sultan Mosque beside the Edirne Gate (Turkish: Edirnekapı) in the western wall of the old city of Istanbul was built between 1562 and 1565. It consists of a fountain, medrese and hamam. Unlike its namesake, it features a single minaret.

She also commissioned the repair of the 'Ayn Zubaydah spring in Mecca and established a foundation to supply wrought iron to the navy.

Mimar Sinan

Mimar Sinan, a sixteenth-century architect, was allegedly in love with Mihrimah after supposedly seeing her for the first time while she was accompanying her father on his Moldova Campaign. To impress her, Sinan built a bridge spanning the Prut River in just thirteen days. He asked for her hand in marriage only to have his proposal rejected by her father. He is then said to have poured his heart into his architecture. Some claim that he built the Mihrimah Sultan Mosque in Üsküdar to resemble the silhouette of a woman with her skirt sweeping the ground.

Death
Mihrimah Sultan died in Istanbul on 25 January 1578 having outlived all her siblings. She is Süleyman's only child to have been buried in his tomb in the Süleymaniye Mosque complex.

In popular culture
 In the 2011–2014 TV series Muhteşem Yüzyıl (The Magnificent Century) she was portrayed by Pelin Karahan.
 She appears as a central character in The Architect's Apprentice, a 2014 novel by Elif Shafak.

 She is one of the central characters in the book Hürrem ve Mihrimah Sultan: Haremin Gülü ve Goncası (Turkish: Hürrem and Mihrimah Sultan: The Rose and the Rosebud of Harem) by Muhterem Yüceyılmaz.

References

Bibliography

External links 

 Photos of Mihrimah Sultan Mosque in Edirnekapi
 Photos of Iskele Mosque (aka Mihrimah) in Uskudar
 Mihrimah Sultan Mosque in Edirnekapi
 Mihrimah Sultan – an Ottoman princess' legacy survives

1520s births
1578 deaths
16th-century Ottoman princesses